The Battle of Bizani (Máchi tou Bizaníou) took place in Epirus on . The battle was fought between Greek and Ottoman forces during the last stages of the First Balkan War, and revolved around the forts of Bizani, which covered the approaches to Ioannina, the largest city in the region.

At the outbreak of the war, the Hellenic Army on the Epirus front did not have the numbers to initiate an offensive against the German-designed defensive positions in Bizani. However, after the campaign in Macedonia was over, many Greek troops were redeployed to Epirus, where Crown Prince Constantine himself assumed command. In the battle that followed the Ottoman positions were breached and Ioannina taken. Despite having a slight numerical advantage, this was not the decisive factor in the Greek victory. Rather, "solid operational planning" by the Greeks was key as it helped them implement a well-coordinated and executed assault that did not allow the Ottoman forces time to react. Furthermore, the bombardment of Ottoman positions was the heaviest in world history up to that time.

Background

As the main war effort of Greece was initially turned towards Macedonia, on the Epirus front the Hellenic Army was outnumbered by the Ottoman Yanya Corps at the outbreak of hostilities in October 1912. After stopping an initial attack by the Ottoman commander Esad Pasha at Gribovo, however, the Greeks succeeded in liberating Preveza (October 21) and pushing north in the direction of Ioannina, repulsing an Ottoman attack at Pente Pigadia (Beshpinar). On November 5, a small force from Corfu made a landing and captured the coastal area of Himarë without facing significant resistance, and on December 20 Greek troops improved their positions in Epirus and entered Korçë, north of Ioannina, thus cutting off its last supply route and threatening the city's northeastern flank.

Prelude

The terrain south of Ioannina provided excellent defensive ground. Moreover, the Ottoman forces further reinforced their positions with permanent fortifications, constructed under the direction of the German General Rüdiger von der Goltz. These were equipped with concrete artillery emplacements, bunkers, trenches, barbed wire, searchlights and machine gun positions. The Ioannina fortress area included two major fortresses, those of Bizani and Kastritsa, guarding the main southern approaches, along with five smaller forts in a ring around the city, covering the western and northwestern approaches. The forts were well supplied with artillery, totaling some 102 pieces (most of them 87 mm). By December 1912, both sides were reinforced: the Ottomans received part of the Vardar Army, retreating after the Battle of Monastir, bringing their forces up to some 35,000, while the Greeks also brought up the 2nd Division from Macedonia and a number of volunteer regiments, for a total of 25,000 men. The Greeks launched a first attack on the fortress area on December 14. The Ottomans succeeded in repelling it in a series of actions that lasted until December 22, and even gained some ground, albeit at the cost of high casualties which depleted their numbers to some 26,000 men.

With operations in Macedonia completed, the Greek High Command now turned its attention to Epirus. Three divisions were transferred to the theater, raising the total of Greek troops to ca. 40,000, along with 80 artillery pieces (amongst which 12 heavy 105 mm and 155 mm guns) and six aircraft. On the other hand, an additional number of Ottoman soldiers, who were retreating from the Macedonian front, reinforced the defenders. Throughout the period, the siege continued actively, with artillery duels, attacks by Albanian irregulars on Greek supply lines, and reconnaissance and bombing missions on the city by the Greek airplanes. At the same time, the hardships of the winter affected the morale of both sides. The Greek Epirus front commander, General Konstantinos Sapountzakis, launched a new frontal attack on January 20. Although it gained ground, pushing the defenders back into the fort of Bizani, the high casualty rate and the worsening weather resulted in the operation being suspended a few days later.

During the preparations, a mixed unit that included local women protected the left flank of the Hellenic Army, against a possible attack by Ottoman groups that were stationed in Paramythia. Moreover, groups consisting of local females supported the Greek side in several ways, particularly in the transportation of guns, food, clothes, and other important supplies. On specific occasions women also participated in the armed conflicts against the Ottoman forces, some of them were distinguished in the battlefield, like Maria Nastouli, who reached the rank of captain.

Battle

After the renewed failure, Sapountzakis was relieved of his command and replaced by Crown Prince Constantine. Constantine now proceeded to carefully marshal his forces, bringing up more men and artillery. The Crown Prince formulated a new plan, whereby his army would feign an attack on Bizani from the southeast, while the main effort would be actually directed on the fortress area's southwestern flank

The Greek artillery began firing a preparatory bombardment on March 4, continuing through the day. It is estimated that the Greeks fired 150 rounds per gun in this bombardment, while Ottoman counter-fire was hampered by lack of ammunition. At the same time the Metsovon Joint Brigade launched a diversionary attack from the north. The first Greek units, with heavy artillery support, breached the defensive line in Tsouka sector at morning, and during the following hours the Ottoman defenses were broken in five locations. As a result, the defending Ottoman units from Tsouka to Manoliasa retreated immediately to Ioannina in order to avoid encirclement. Moreover, as these breakthroughs from different axes threatened to collapse the entire defensive perimeter and to cut off his front echelons, Esad Pasha was forced to keep his reserve troops back and engage them in a defensive role. By 18h, the Greek 1st Evzone Regiment, together with the 9th Battalion commanded by Major Ioannis Velissariou, entered the village of Agios Ioannis on the southern outskirts of Ioannina.

As a consequence of the Greek advance, the fortresses of Bizani and Kastritsa were cut off by 16h and isolated from the rest of the Ottoman army and its headquarters in Ioannina. As night fell, the forts ceased firing, and their garrisons abandoned them, trying to escape through the rather loose Greek encirclement to Ioannina. In their attempt to withdraw towards Ioannina, a significant number of Ottoman troops, totaling 35 officers and 935 soldiers, were captured by the Greek units positioned on the city's southern outskirts. Several Ottoman positions capitulated the next morning, although Bizani and Kastritsa continued to resist until after the surrender. Meanwhile, Esad Pasha realized that the battle was lost, and tried to evacuate as many troops and wounded as he could to the north. As the Greeks pressed their advance however, he contacted the city's foreign consulates to seek help in negotiating a surrender. The following day the Greek forces under Crown Prince Constantine were parading through the flag-covered streets of the city. On the other hand, Esad Pasha upon arriving in Turkey was welcomed as a national hero.

Aerial warfare

The Greek forces used a small fleet of six airplanes, which mainly consisted of Farman HF and MF biplanes during the operations. They used an airfield near Nicopolis and performed several reconnaissance and bombing missions with considerable effect. On numerous occasions the Ottoman troops after recovering from their initial confusion attempted to shoot down the airplanes with their rifles with little success. Nevertheless N. de Sackoff, a Russian pilot flying for the Greeks became the first pilot ever shot down in combat when his biplane was hit by ground fire. He then came down near Preveza, repaired his airplane and resumed flight back to his base. The day Ioannina came under Greek control Adamidis, also a native of the city, landed his Farman MF biplane on the city Town Hall square, to the adulation of an enthusiastic crowd.

Aftermath

During the battle, 2,800 Ottomans died, while the Greeks suffered much lighter losses with 500 dead and wounded. The Greeks also captured some 8,600 prisoners, while the remainder of the Ottoman garrison was able to retreat into Albania. The Greeks also captured 108 artillery pieces and large amounts of matériel. On  the Greek forces entered Gjirokastër and Delvinë, and took Tepelenë the next day. At the end of the war they reached a line that stretched from the Ceraunian mountains (above Himarë) on the Ionian coast to Lake Prespa to the east. The success on the Epirus front enabled the Greek headquarters to transfer part of the army to Thessaloniki, in preparation for a confrontation against the Bulgarians. Given the strongly entrenched opposition the Hellenic Army faced, historian Richard Hall cites the Battle of Bizani and the fall of Ioannina as Greece's greatest military achievement in the First Balkan War. Numerical superiority was not a decisive factor for the Greeks during the final assault. Instead it was the way they planned their operations that led to a well coordinated and executed assault that left no opportunity for the Ottoman side to react in time. The surrender of Ioannina secured Greek control of southern Epirus and the Ionian coast. At the same time, it was denied to the newly formed Albanian state, for which it might have provided a southern anchor-point comparable to Shkodër in the north (see also Provisional Government of Albania).

Notes

Citations

References

External links

 

1913 in the Ottoman Empire
Battles involving the Ottoman Empire
Constantine I of Greece
Conflicts in 1913
Battles of the First Balkan War
First Balkan War
Sieges involving Greece
March 1913 events
Modern history of Epirus
Janina vilayet
History of Ioannina
1913 in Greece